Solatisonax rudigerbieleri is a species of deep-water sea snail, a marine gastropod mollusk in the family Architectonicidae, the staircase shells or sundials.

References

Architectonicidae
Molluscs described in 2011